Giordano Müller Piffero (born 5 August 1993), commonly known as Giordano, is a Brazilian footballer, playing in defender position.

Career
On 20 February 2020 Lithuanian side FC Džiugas announced a contract with Giordano. However, the COVID-19 pandemic forced Giordano to return to Brazil in March. Lithuanian football season was about to restart at the beginning of June, but the pandemic in Brazil was getting worse, meaning that the player would not be able to return in time. The contract was terminated by mutual consent on 12 May with Giordano having not played a single game.

Career statistics

Club

Notes

References

1993 births
Living people
Brazilian footballers
Brazilian expatriate footballers
Association football defenders
Footballers from Porto Alegre
Sport Club Internacional players
Sociedade Esportiva e Recreativa Caxias do Sul players
Canoas Sport Club players
Cerâmica Atlético Clube players
CR Vasco da Gama players
Esporte Clube Juventude players
Sociedade Esportiva Recreativa e Cultural Brasil players
S.C. Beira-Mar players
Clube Atlético Tubarão players
Esporte Clube Internacional players
Grêmio Esportivo Glória players
AC Kajaani players
FC Džiugas players
Liga Portugal 2 players
Ykkönen players
Brazilian expatriate sportspeople in Portugal
Brazilian expatriate sportspeople in Finland
Brazilian expatriate sportspeople in Lithuania
Brazilian expatriate sportspeople in Spain
Expatriate footballers in Portugal
Expatriate footballers in Finland
Expatriate footballers in Lithuania
Expatriate footballers in Spain